The Black Eye Galaxy (also called Sleeping Beauty Galaxy or Evil Eye Galaxy and designated Messier 64, M64, or NGC 4826) is a relatively isolated spiral galaxy 17 million light-years away in the mildly northern constellation of Coma Berenices. It was discovered by Edward Pigott in March 1779, and independently by Johann Elert Bode in April of the same year, as well as by Charles Messier the next year. A dark band of absorbing dust partially in front of its bright nucleus gave rise to its nicknames of the "Black Eye", "Evil Eye", or "Sleeping Beauty" galaxy. M64 is well known among amateur astronomers due to its form in small telescopes and visibility across inhabited latitudes.

This galaxy is inclined 60° to the line-of-sight and has a position angle of 112°. The morphological classification in the De Vaucouleurs system is (R)SA(rs)ab, where the '(R)' indicates an outer ring-like structure, 'SA' denotes a non-barred spiral, '(rs)' means a transitional inner ring/spiral structure, and 'ab' says the spiral arms are fairly tightly wound. Ann et al. (2015) gave it a class of SABa, suggesting a weakly barred spiral galaxy with tightly wound arms.

M64 is a type 2 Seyfert galaxy with an HII/LINER nucleus. The central region is a weak source of radio emission. A soft X-ray source has been detected at the nucleus, which is most likely coming from the circumnuclear region rather than directly from an active galactic nucleus. At present, the non-rotational motions of this disk do not significantly feed the core, but the disk does produce a vigorous rate of star formation, with also approximately 100 billion stars inside the galaxy. There is also evidence of a recent large inflow of mass.

The interstellar medium of Messier 64 consists of two counter-rotating disks that are approximately equal in mass. The inner disk contains the prominent dust lanes of the galaxy. The stellar population of the galaxy exhibits no measurable counter-rotation. Possible formation scenarios include a merger with a gas-rich satellite galaxy in a retrograde orbit, or the continued accretion of gas clouds from the intergalactic medium.

See also
 List of Messier objects
 NGC 4622 – A galaxy with leading spiral arms.

References

External links

 Messier 64, SEDS Messier pages
 ESA/Hubble images of M64
 
 
 a real photo by Pete Albrecht 
 Black Eye Galaxy (M64) at Constellation Guide

Unbarred spiral galaxies
Coma Berenices
Messier objects
NGC objects
Virgo Supercluster
Astronomical objects discovered in 1779
Discoveries by Edward Pigott